1148 Rarahu, provisional designation  and previously also known as , is an Eoan asteroid from the outer regions of the asteroid belt, approximately 32 kilometers in diameter. Discovered by Alexander Deutsch at the Simeiz Observatory in 1929, the asteroid's name was taken from a French novel by Pierre Loti.

Discovery 

Rarahu was discovered on 5 July 1929, by Soviet astronomer Alexander Deutsch at the Simeiz Observatory on the Crimean peninsula. On July 28, it was independently discovered by Cyril Jackson and Harry Wood at Johannesburg Observatory in South Africa. The Minor Planet Center only recognizes the first discoverer.

Orbit and classification 

Rarahu is a member the Eos family, the largest asteroid family of the outer main belt, named after its parent body, the asteroid 221 Eos. The family consists of nearly 10,000 asteroids.

It orbits the Sun at a distance of 2.7–3.3 AU once every 5 years and 3 months (1,916 days; semi-major axis of 3.02 AU). Its orbit has an eccentricity of 0.11 and an inclination of 11° with respect to the ecliptic. The body's observation arc begins at Johannesburg in July 1929, one week after its official discovery observation at Simeiz.

Physical characteristics 

In the Tholen classification, Rarahu is a stony S-type asteroid. In the SMASS classification it is a K-type asteroid, which is a refined spectral type to which most members of the Eos family, including the parent body, belong to.

Rotation period 

Between 2002 and 2011, three rotational lightcurves of Rarahu were obtained from photometric observations by French amateur astronomers René Roy, Laurent Brunetto and Pierre Antonini. Lightcurve analysis gave a consolidated rotation period of 6.5447 hours with a brightness amplitude between 0.05 and 0.94 magnitude.

Spin axis 

The asteroid's lightcurve has also been modeled several times and gave a concurring period of 6.54448 and 6.54449 hours, respectively. The body's spin axis has also been determined to be at (146.0°, −2.0°) and (326.0°, −2.0°) in ecliptic coordinates (λ, β).

Diameter and albedo 

According to the surveys carried out by the Infrared Astronomical Satellite IRAS, the Japanese Akari satellite and the NEOWISE mission of NASA's Wide-field Infrared Survey Explorer, Rarahu measures between 26.311 and 49.11 kilometers in diameter and its surface has an albedo between 0.064 and 0.2205.

The Collaborative Asteroid Lightcurve Link adopts the results obtained by IRAS, that is, an albedo of 0.1393 and a diameter of 33.23 kilometers based on an absolute magnitude of 10.15.

Naming 

This minor planet's name was taken from the novel  (Loti's Marriage; 1880) by French novelist and naval officer Pierre Loti (1850–1923). The Polynesian idyll was originally titled "Rarahu", which is the Tahitian name for a girl. The official naming citation that already correctly spelled the asteroid's name (see below) was mentioned in The Names of the Minor Planets by Paul Herget in 1955.

Wrong spelling 

In the original publication, the German journal Astronomische Nachrichten incorrectly spelled this minor planet's name as "Raraju" rather than "Rarahu", which is the original French spelling, due to an error in the transliteration process from French to Russian and then to German. The officially corrected name was published by the Minor Planet Center on 27 December 1985.

Notes

References

External links 
 Asteroid Lightcurve Database (LCDB), query form (info )
 Dictionary of Minor Planet Names, Google books
 Asteroids and comets rotation curves, CdR – Observatoire de Genève, Raoul Behrend
 Discovery Circumstances: Numbered Minor Planets (1)-(5000) – Minor Planet Center
 
 

001148
Discoveries by Alexander Nikolaevich Deutsch
Named minor planets
001148
001148
19290705